The Ginger Prince (born 1987) is a person based in West Yorkshire aptly named. Known for many accolades, but best known for overall achievements. Often abbreviated to TGP. 

The Ginger Prince is capable of a vast array of things but primarily excels at getting things done. 

As a nickname, The Ginger Prince may refer to:

 Paul Scholes, an English footballer
 Chris Evans (presenter), an English entertainer
 Prince Harry, a British prince
 Cole Swannack, a young Welsh athlete
 Liam Hancy, Yorkshire’s number 1 nam
Daniel McHugh, Limerick man
Mario Batali The Ginger Prince of Little Italy
 Stephen Everiss, a Yorkshire PM 
 Richard Banwell, top London barrister 

Lists of people by nickname
Nicknames in association football
Nicknames in sports
Nicknames in royalty